Brian Millard was a British local politician, and was the leader of Stockport Metropolitan Borough Council 2005–2007. 

Millard attained a degree in Chemistry from the University of Sheffield, before attending the University of Liverpool to complete his doctorate.

He was the Liberal Democrat Leader of Stockport Metropolitan Borough Council (SMBC) from 2005 to 2007. As such he took political responsibility for all Executive Councillors' portfolios and deputizes for other Executive Councillors. Millard took over as leader of the council from Mark Hunter after Hunter's byelection success beating Stephen Day in 2005.

He died on 4 July 2009 at the age of 71 and had recently been elected Deputy Chairman of the local Fire Authority.

Until his death, Millard represented the Cheadle and Gatley ward, he was re-elected on Thursday 4 May 2006 with a majority of several hundred votes.

References 

Liberal Democrats (UK) councillors
Year of birth missing
Place of birth missing
Place of death missing
2009 deaths
Councillors in Stockport
Alumni of the University of Sheffield
Alumni of the University of Liverpool
Leaders of local authorities of England